The 900s decade ran from January 1, 900, to December 31, 909.

Significant people
 Al-Mu'tadid
 Ali al-Muktafi
 Al-Muqtadir
 Leo VI of Byzantium
 Badr al-Mu'tadidi military leader
 Abdallah ibn al-Mu'tazz

References